Libodřice is a municipality and village in Kolín District in the Central Bohemian Region of the Czech Republic. It has about 300 inhabitants.

Geography
It lies in the Upper Sázava Hills, a small part of the municipal territory in the west extends into the Central Elbe Table. The Blinka Stream flows through the municipality.

History
The first written mention of Libodřice is from 1266.

Economy
There is a quarry on the southwestern edge of the municipality. Amphibolite is extracted here.

Sights

The most important monument, protected as an archaeological monument reservation are Libodřice tumuli. It is a mound burial site from the Late Bronze Age. It is proof of the spread of the Lusatian culture from the East Bohemian region to the left bank of the Elbe in the Kolín region. Today, there are a total of 20–25 exceptionally well-preserved barrows, up to 1.5 metres high with a diameter at the base ranging from 5 to 15 metres. The archaeological findings were placed in the Regional Museum in Kolín and its branch in Kouřim.

Bauer's Villa is a villa built by the architect Josef Gočár in 1912–1913 for the landowner Adolf Bauer. It is an architecturally valuable cubist building. Today the villa is owned by the municipality and used to be open to the public. The villa houses the largest collection of Cubist ceramics in the world. The dominant feature of the garden is a romantic replica of a cubist gazebo.

The Libodřice Castle was built in 1750 by reconstruction of a local fortress. It was the centre of administration until 1923. Then it was converted into a farm building and after 1950 into apartments and offices, and lost its historic value. Today it is privately owned.

References

External links

Villages in Kolín District